Gunnarsson is a surname of Icelandic or Swedish origin, meaning son of Gunnar. In Icelandic names, the name is not strictly a surname, but a patronymic. Notable people with the surname include:
Ágúst Ævar Gunnarsson (contemporary), Icelandic post-rock musician
Aron Gunnarsson (born 1989), Icelandic professional football player
Brynjar Gunnarsson (born 1975), Icelandic professional football player
Carl Gunnarsson (born 1986), Swedish professional ice hockey player
Daniel Gunnarsson (born 1992), Swedish professional ice hockey player
Guðmundur Gunnarsson (born 1945), Icelandic labor leader; father of father of Icelandic singer Björk
Guðmundur Steinn Gunnarsson (born 1982), Icelandic musician and composer
Gunnar Gunnarsson (1889–1975), Icelandic author
Gunnar Kristinn Gunnarsson (born 1933), Icelandic chess master
Gunnar Thor Gunnarsson (born 1985), Icelandic professional football player
Göran Gunnarsson (born 1950), Swedish lieutenant general
Hanna Gunnarsson (born 1983), Swedish politician
Hermann Gunnarsson (contemporary), Icelandic television and radio personality
Jan Gunnarsson (born 1962), Swedish tennis player
Johánnes Gunnarsson (1897–1972), Icelandic Roman Catholic prelate
Jonas Gunnarsson (disambiguation), several people
Patrik Gunnarsson (born 2000), Icelandic professional football player
Pétur Gunnarsson (born 1947), Icelandic author, poet, and translator
Rolf Gunnarsson (born 1946), Swedish politician; member of the Riksdag since 1994
Sturla Gunnarsson (born 1951), Iceland-born Canadian film director
Susanne Gunnarsson (born 1963), Swedish Olympic canoeist
Thorarinn Gunnarsson (contemporary), American science-fiction and fantasy author
Þórhallur Gunnarsson (born 1963), Icelandic actor and television personality
Veigar Páll Gunnarsson (born 1980), Icelandic professional football player
Victor Gunnarsson (1953–1993), Swedish extremist suspected in the murder of Swedish prime minister Olof Palme

See also
Gunnarsdóttir

Icelandic-language surnames
Swedish-language surnames